A doll is a model of a human being, often a children's toy.

Doll or The Doll may also refer to:

Film and television
 The Doll (1911 film) ("Păpușa"), a Romanian silent film; see Cinema of Romania
 The Doll (1919 film), a German silent film
 The Doll (1968 film), a Polish drama
 The Doll, a 1973 Italian TV movie for the Door into Darkness series
 The Doll (2008 film), an American short film
 The Doll (2015 film), a Chinese horror film
 "The Doll" (Amazing Stories), a 1986 episode
 "The Doll" (Seinfeld), a 1996 episode of the TV sitcom Seinfeld

Literature
 Doll (manga), a 1998 science fiction manga
 The Doll (novel), by Bolesław Prus
 The Doll (Kadare novel), by Ismail Kadare (2020)
 Summer of the Seventeenth Doll, a 1955 play by Ray Lawler

Music
 Doll (band), a Canadian punk rock/new grunge band 
 The Doll (band), a punk rock/new wave band from London, England
 New York Dolls, a hard rock band from New York
Doll, an album by Keiko Matsui
 The Doll, a 2014 music album by director/composer Dante Tomaselli
Doll, an album by  Kevin Cahoon and Ghetto Cowboy 2006
 "Doll", a song composed by Foo Fighters, from their 1997 album The Colour and the Shape
 "Doll" (song), a song by the Japanese pop rock band Scandal

People
Doll (surname)
Angie the Talking Doll, a character from You Can't Do That on Television
Baby Doll (wrestler), American professional wrestler
California Doll, a female professional wrestler from the Gorgeous Ladies of Wrestling

Other uses
 Doll (locomotive), based in Bedfordshire, England
 Doll, Highland, crofting township and rural village in Scotland
 Slang term for a depressant (type of drug), as in the American novel Valley of the Dolls

See also
 Dolls (disambiguation)
 Dollmaker (disambiguation)